Air Marshal Sir Arthur William Baynes McDonald,  (14 June 1903 – 26 July 1996) was a senior Royal Air Force officer. He served as Commander-in-Chief of the Royal Pakistan Air Force from 1955 to 1957.

Early life
McDonald was born on 14 June 1903 in either South Africa or Antigua. His father was a British Army doctor who had served in the Second Boer War. He grew up on the Caribbean islands of Saint Kitts and Antigua, then members of the British West Indies. He was educated at Antigua Grammar School, before joining Epsom College, a public school in Surrey, England. He studied engineering at Peterhouse, Cambridge, graduating with a Bachelor of Arts (BA) degree: as per tradition, his BA was promoted to a Master of Arts (MA Cantab) degree.

Military career
On 15 March 1924, McDonald was commissioned into the General Duties Branch of the Royal Air Force (RAF) as a pilot officer on probation. His commission and rank were confirmed on 15 September 1924. He was promoted to flying officer on 15 October 1925. On 1 September 1928, he was granted a permanent commission. He was promoted to flight lieutenant on 13 October 1929.

McDonald was appointed Officer Commanding No. 79 Squadron and then Officer Commanding No. 32 Squadron in 1937. He served in the Second World War as Assistant Director of Repair and Servicing at the Air Ministry and then on the staff at Headquarters Fighter Command, before becoming Air Defence Commander in Ceylon in 1942, Air Officer Training at Headquarters Air Command of South East Asia Command in 1943 and Air Officer Commanding No. 106 Group in April 1945.

After the war, McDonald was appointed Commandant of the RAF Staff College, Andover and then Commandant of the Aeroplane and Armament Experimental Establishment before becoming Director-General of Manning in the rank of air vice marshal at the Air Ministry in 1952.

In June 1955, McDonald became the fourth and last Commander-in-Chief of the Royal Pakistan Air Force. At the time of his retirement the Royal Pakistan Air Force became the Pakistan Air Force, and McDonald was succeeded in the command of the renamed force by Air Marshal Asghar Khan.

McDonald's last appointments were as Air Officer Commanding-in-Chief at Technical Training Command in 1958 and as Air Member for Personnel in 1959 before retiring in 1962.

Sailing
A keen sailor, McDonald competed in the 1948 Summer Olympics. He represented Great Britain in the Firefly event. He came ninth out of 21 competitors. He later became Admiral of the RAF Sailing Association.

Later life
Following retirement, McDonald continued sailing, and was an active member of the Royal Lymington Yacht Club. He won his last race at the age of 92. He died on 26 July 1996, aged 93.

References

|-
 

|-

Royal Air Force air marshals
Chiefs of Air Staff, Pakistan
Pakistan Air Force air marshals
Pakistan Air Force officers
1903 births
1996 deaths
Knights Commander of the Order of the Bath
Recipients of the Air Force Cross (United Kingdom)
People educated at Epsom College
Alumni of Peterhouse, Cambridge
Sailors at the 1948 Summer Olympics – Firefly
Male sailors
British Leeward Islands people of World War II
British expatriates in Pakistan
Olympic sailors of Great Britain
Royal Air Force personnel of World War II